"C'mon Everybody" is a 1958 song by Eddie Cochran and Jerry Capehart, originally released as a B-side.

Background
When Cochran recorded his lead vocal for the song, he also created an alternate version of the song called "Let's Get Together". The only change to the lyrics was exactly that: the phrase "Let's get together" in place of "C'mon everybody". This alternate version was eventually released on a compilation album in the 1960s.

Personnel
 Eddie Cochranvocal, guitar, guitar and drum overdub
 Connie 'Guybo' Smithelectric bass
 Earl Palmerdrums
 Ray Johnsonpiano
 Jerry Capeharttambourine

Chart performance
In 1959 it peaked in the UK (where Cochran had major success and where he died in 1960) at number six in the singles chart, and, thirty years later, in 1988, the track was re-issued there and became a number 14 hit. In the United States the song got to number 35 on the Billboard Hot 100.

Legacy
Sex Pistols covered the song for their soundtrack The Great Rock 'n' Roll Swindle in 1979. The song is one of the Rock and Roll Hall of Fame 500.  "C'mon Everybody" is ranked number 403 on the Rolling Stone magazine's list of The 500 Greatest Songs of All Time. It was also used by Levi Strauss & Co. to promote their 501 jeans line in 1988. The song was re-released as a promotional single that year. The Hershey Company used Cochran's version in a 2021 promotional advertisement for Hershey's chocolate.

English rock band Humble Pie covered the song for their 1972 album Smokin', which had a heavier distorted tone and featured original guitar licks and a guitar solo incorporated by the band.

References

1958 singles
1959 singles
Eddie Cochran songs
Songs written by Eddie Cochran
Songs written by Jerry Capehart
Liberty Records singles
1958 songs
London Records singles